The 2016 Tour de Pologne was be the 73rd edition of the Tour de Pologne cycling stage race. It was scheduled from 12 to 18 July as the nineteenth event of the 2016 UCI World Tour.

Schedule

Participating teams
As the Tour de Pologne is a UCI World Tour event, all eighteen UCI Pro Teams were invited automatically and obliged to enter a team into the race. Along with Team Poland – the Polish national team – six other squads were given wildcard places into the race, and as such, formed the event's 25-team peloton. The number of riders allowed per squad will be eight, therefore the start list will contain a total of 200 riders.

Stages

Stage 1
12 July 2016 — Radzymin to Warszawa,

Stage 2
13 July 2016 — Tarnowskie Góry to Katowice,

Stage 3
14 July 2016 — Zawiercie to Nowy Sącz,

Stage 4
15 July 2016 — Nowy Sącz to Rzeszów,

Stage 5
16 July 2016 — Wieliczka to Zakopane,

Stage 6
17 July 2016 — Terma Bukowina Tatrzańska to Bukowina Tatrzańska,   
 Stage cancelled due to weather conditions.

Stage 7
18 July 2016 — Krakow to Krakow, individual time trial (ITT)

Classification leadership

References

External links
 

Tour de Pologne
Tour de Pologne
2016 in Polish sport
Tour de Pologne